Mohammad Esmaeil Saeidi (born 1961) is an Iranian retired Revolutionary Guards commander and politician affiliated with the Front of Islamic Revolution Stability.

Saeidi was born in Azarshahr. He is a member of the 9th Islamic Consultative Assembly from the electorate of Tabriz, Osku and Azarshahr with Alireza Mondi Sefidan, Masoud Pezeshkian, Mir-Hadi Gharaseyyed Romiani, Mohammad Hosein Farhanghi and Reza Rahmani. Saeidi won with 121,123 (38.66%) votes.

References

External links
 Saeidi Website

People from Azarshahr
Deputies of Tabriz, Osku and Azarshahr
Living people
1961 births
Members of the 9th Islamic Consultative Assembly
Front of Islamic Revolution Stability politicians
Members of the 10th Islamic Consultative Assembly
Islamic Revolutionary Guard Corps second brigadier generals
Islamic Revolutionary Guard Corps personnel of the Iran–Iraq War